Weerayut Srivichai (born March 1, 1988), is a Thai professional footballer who plays as a left-winger for Thai League 2 club  Lampang.

External links
 

1988 births
Living people
Weerayut Srivichai
Association football forwards
Weerayut Srivichai
Weerayut Srivichai
Weerayut Srivichai
Weerayut Srivichai